Aziz El Khanchaf (born 25 August 1977) is a French former professional footballer who played as a midfielder.

Career
El Khanchaf played for Laval, Wasquehal, RC Paris, Ronse, Mons, Red Star Waasland, Boussu Dour Borinage, Willebroek-Meerhof and La Louvière Centre. He made his professional debut for Laval on 2 October 1996 in a 4–1 Ligue 2 loss to LB Châteauroux, coming on for the injured Stéphane Pédron in the 36th minute. He scored his first goal on 2 November 1996 in a 3–1 league win over Red Star.

References

External links
 Profile

Living people
1977 births
French footballers
French sportspeople of Moroccan descent
Stade Lavallois players
Racing Club de France Football players
R.A.E.C. Mons players
UR La Louvière Centre players
Footballers from Orléans
Association football midfielders
Wasquehal Football players
K.S.K. Ronse players
S.K. Beveren players
Francs Borains players
Belgian Pro League players
Challenger Pro League players
Ligue 2 players